Gregory I. Sivashinsky (also known as Grisha) is a professor at Tel Aviv University, working in the field of combustion and theoretical physics.

Biography 
Sivashinsky was born in Moscow to Israel and Tatiana Sivashinsky. He is married to Terry Sivashinsky. He finished his master's degree at Moscow State University in 1967 and worked as a research assistant there until 1971. He emigrated to Israel in 1971. He was a pupil of Grigory Barenblatt and Yakov Borisovich Zel'dovich. He completed his PhD at Technion – Israel Institute of Technology in 1973 and worked as a lecturer there for two years. He joined Tel Aviv University in 1974 and settled there. He is the recipient of Ya.B. Zeldovich Gold Medal from The Combustion Institute and a fellow of The Combustion Institute.

See also

References

External links
 

Fluid dynamicists
1945 births
Living people
Fellows of The Combustion Institute